Lovers & Movies is a 2015 Chinese romantic comedy film directed by Niu Chaoyang. It was released on April 30, 2015.

Cast
Francis Ng as Yao Xingjie
Yu Nan as Ruoyao
Kim Bum as Lin Jun
Guli Nazha as Jiameng
Simon Yam as Qiu Guitang
Kara Hui as Ruanhua
Zhang Xueying as Siyu
Wang Zongze as Qiu Shui
Jiang Wu as Master Liu
Niu Ben as Grandpa
Lu Yuan as Grandma

Reception
By May 4, the film had earned $1.13 million at the Chinese box office.

References

2015 romantic comedy films
Chinese romantic comedy films